Orroli, meaning "downy oak" (Arrólli in Sardinian language) is, a comune (municipality) in the Province of South Sardinia in the Italian region of Sardinia, located about  north of Cagliari.
Orroli territory hosts one of the most important nuraghi of Sardinia called Nuraghe Arrubiu, the only intact example of a five-tower nuraghe, one of the dam in the Flumendosa river and the dam of the Mulargia, which gave name to the artificial lake. Within the village there are many hostels and bed and breakfasts organized around old lifestyles and ancient traditions.

Orroli borders the following municipalities: Escalaplano, Esterzili, Goni, Nurri, Siurgus Donigala.

Demographic evolution

References

External links 

 www.comuneorroli.it

Cities and towns in Sardinia